Dominik Kirnbauer (born 28 August 2002) is an Austrian footballer currently playing as a midfielder for SV Lafnitz.

Career statistics

Club

Notes

References

2002 births
Living people
Austrian footballers
Association football midfielders
Austrian Football Bundesliga players
TSV Hartberg players
People from Oberwart
Footballers from Burgenland